Mohammadabad-e Amin (also Romanized as Moḩammadābād-e Amīn and Moḩammadābād-e Amīnī) is a village in Kahrizak Rural District, Kahrizak District, Ray County, Tehran Province, Iran. At the 2006 census, its population was 280, in 83 families.

References 

Populated places in Ray County, Iran